St. John's International School is an English-language international school located in Waterloo, Belgium. The school has a student body from a very international background with 55 different nationalities represented. St. John's International School runs from day-care  to 12th grade, the final year of high school. It offers the International Baccalaureate Diploma program, AP programs are also offered by the school.

History
St. John's International School was established by the FCJ Sisters in the annexe of their pre-existing school in Brussels, Montjoie, which still exists but is under Archdiocesan control. It was founded at the request of American businessmen based around the Brussels Capital Region who were seeking an English-medium Christian education for their children. There were 114 students from grades 1 to 8 that first school year. In 1969 it moved to its current campus in Waterloo. The high school was added gradually from 1971 onwards. The International Baccalaureate programme was adopted in 1978. In 2016, the school was acquired for an undisclosed sum by the Inspired Group of schools (www.inspirededu.co.uk), led by Nadim M Nsouli, educating over 48,000 students across an international network of over 60 schools on 5 continents.

Curriculum
The International Baccalaureate Primary Years, Middle Years and Diploma programmes are offered. Advanced Placement (AP) courses are also available.

Athletics
Along with a prestigious academic program, St. John's also possesses a rigorous and highly successful athletics program. Using the team name "The Lions", the school competes regularly in the ISSTs (International School Sports Tournament), among others. Over the years St. John's has won top honours at the ISSTs for track and field, volleyball, golf, tennis and basketball.  The school has two art gymnasiums, as well as a new Astroturf soccer field. Teams usually compete on weekends.

In Elementary school, students are encouraged to participate in numerous sports and can join school teams such as the Track and Field Team. Once in Middle School, the sports program becomes more competitive and the students can participate in all of the sports that the school has to offer. The Middle School teams are divided into the "A team" and the "B team". The High School Sports program is the most competitive and draws the most school spirit. In high school the teams are divided into JV and Varsity, and compete against schools in Europe and as far away as Cairo. It is the High School teams that compete in the ISST tournaments.

Sports
The mascot is the lion, and team names are often abbreviated to SJIS or more often; STJ. St. John's offers a wide range of sports throughout the Autumn/Fall, Winter and Spring seasons: Football (Soccer), Volleyball, Cross Country, Swimming, Basketball, Rugby, Track and Field, Baseball, Softball and Golf. Most sports include Middle School "A" and "B" teams, and High School "Junior Varsity" and "Varsity" teams.

Basketball
St. John's won 3 consecutive Div. 1 ISST Varsity Boys Basketball Championships in 2003, 2004, 2005.

Volleyball
In 2004, the Lions Div. 1 girls' varsity volleyball team won the school their first volleyball ISST's in 11 years. On November 13, 2010, the Lions Div. 1 boys' varsity volleyball team finished 3rd in the volleyball ISST's.

Track and field
In 2004, St. John's secured themselves another ISST win; a boys' varsity track and field ISST win. The scored a first place in the event, making it the school's second ISST win for anything in under a year. In 2008, St. John's won the track and field ISST's which it repeated in 2011.

Softball
In 2006 and 2008, the St. John's softball team won the Div. 2 Softball ISST's.

Football

Girls
In 2007, the Varsity Girls squad won the Division II Football ISSTs in Vienna, beating Cairo American College 4-1 in the final. In the following years, they have achieved respectable results in Division I, placing 4th place in 2009, and 6th in 2010.

In 2013 the Varsity Girls squad came in third place for Division I Football ISSTs in London, beating TASIS 3-0. The team finished the tournament with three shutouts in five games, only conceding four goals. Players included; Juniors Kate Gerlach and Charlotte Scott (captain) and Sophomores Gabrielle Brocious and Isabel Roche (captain).

Boys
On November 13, 2010, the Varsity Boys squad made St. John's history by becoming the first boys football squad to win the ISSTs since the first team was organized 25 years ago. A remarkable run of 5 wins, no draws, no losses and 17 goals scored, one conceded was enough to crown the boys champions of the 2010 ISST Division II Football Championship. They beat their hosts the British School of Brussels 2-0 in the final, winning each of their four group matches. St. John's beat the International School of the Hague 5-0, the American Community School of Athens 3-1, Cairo American College 2-0 and the American Community School of Hillingdon 5-0. Throughout the entire season, the boys squad showed quality and great footballing technique as they played 28 matches (including the ISSTs); winning 18, drawing seven and losing just three. Along the way, the boys managed to bag in 83 goals, letting in just 38 culminating in an overall goal difference of +45. Memorable moments include beating rivals the International School of Brussels 3-1 at the ISB campus (after losing 1-0 at home,) drawing 5-5 against 2010 Division I runners-up TASIS at home, beating the International School of Luxembourg 2-6 in Luxembourg by scoring four goals in the final 15 minutes of the match, coming back from 1-0 down to beat ACS Athens 3-1 during the group stages of the ISSTs, beating ISST rivals CAC 2-0 and thus securing promotion to Division I and a place in the final with one match to spare, and beating hosts BSB 2-0 in the final after a quick start which resulted in two goals within the opening eight minutes.

Golf
The St. John's golf team consists of some of Belgium's most talented boys and girls golf players. St. John's has been in the top w ISST finishers for the past 2 years.

Wrestling
In 2008 and 2009 Matthew and Christopher Lyon competed in the DODDS- Europe (Department of Defense Dependent Schools) and became two time European Wrestling Champions. In 2008, Matthew Lyon was voted Most Outstanding Wrestler in Europe and was recognized for having the most pins.

Notable former pupils
 Jérôme d'Ambrosio, Belgian Formula One racing driver
 Princess Maria Laura of Belgium, Archduchess of Austria-Este

Visual and Performing Arts
St.Johns has a massive arts program. Annually, St.Johns has had one all-school musical and one spring show in High School. As for middle school, they too have an MS play. Dance is also a major part of St.Johns. Dance classes are provided to all ages! February/March, St.Johns hosts a major dance showcase for the whole school. Choirs and music at St.Johns are very strong and trained.

References

External links

International Schools Sports Tournament

Educational institutions established in 1964
International Baccalaureate schools in Belgium
International schools in Belgium
1964 establishments in Belgium
Buildings and structures in Walloon Brabant
Secondary schools in Belgium
Catholic schools in Belgium
Waterloo, Belgium